Gaurav Narayanan is an Indian film maker who predominantly works in Tamil cinema. He made his debut with the movie Thoonga Nagaram.

Personal life
Gaurav was born at Madurai and graduated from American College with a Master's in English. His strong passion towards cinema made his way to Chennai after his studies.

Career
He started his journey as an assistant cinematographer to Rajarajan. Later he joined with the director N. Maharajan.  Then he worked as co-director for his Guru, director K. S. Ravikumar.

His debut as director, writer and actor through Thoonga Nagaram, a gangster-drama film, received positive responses. This movie had Vimal and Anjali in the lead along with Gaurav himself. Gaurav was awarded as "Best Debutant Director" by Emirates Tamilians Association, EMITAA 2011. His movie bagged "Best Film - Highlighting Tamil Culture" award from Norwary Tamil Film Festival, NTFF 2012 and also was officially screened in Chennai International Film Festival. This movie was dubbed and released as Naluguru Snehitula Katha in Telugu.

His next project, Sigaram Thodu bagged commercial success and recognition, Along with Vikram Prabhu, Sathyaraj and Sathish, Gaurav  also has played in this movie. This is the first South Indian movie to be nominated for screening and selected for the best film competition in Seattle International Film Festival and has won a "Best Film - Social Awareness" award in Norway Tamil Film Festival Awards, NTFF 2015.

Gaurav gave his block buster hit on the silver screen Ippadai Vellum with Lyca Productions starring Udhayanidhi Stalin and Manjima Mohan released worldwide on 9 November 2017, making him a "Hat Trick Director" with three successful box office numbers continuously. The positive reviews  and acclaims received have added feather in the resourceful director's cap.

Filmography

As director, writer and actor

Reach Gaurav on
Facebook
Twitter

References

Tamil film directors
Living people
Male actors from Madurai
21st-century Indian male actors
Male actors in Tamil cinema
Year of birth missing (living people)